Psykogeddon (2006) is an original novel written by Dave Stone and based on the long-running British science fiction comic strip Judge Dredd. It is Stone's fourth Judge Dredd novel, and the third to also feature his character Judge Steel from the spin-off comic series Armitage in the Judge Dredd Megazine.

Synopsis

Arch-criminal Efil Drago San has been arrested in Mega-City One and demands a trial – unprecedented in a city where justice is delivered instantly by the Judges. Nevertheless, his request is granted. But things do not go according to plan.

External links
 Psykogeddon at goodreads.com

Novels by Dave Stone
Judge Dredd novels